Bacup is a town in Rossendale, Lancashire, England.  It contains 78 buildings that are recorded in the National Heritage List for England as designated listed buildings.   Of these, two are listed at Grade II*, the middle grade, and the others are at Grade II, the lowest grade.  The parish contains the town of Bacup, the villages of Broadclough and Stacksteads, and surrounding countryside.  Until the Industrial Revolution the area was agricultural.  The first industry in the town was woollen weaving, followed by cotton weaving.  This was initially carried out in houses specifically designed for this purpose, and later at a larger scale in mills.  The earliest mills were water-powered, and they were superseded by steam power in the second quarter of the 19th century.  Further expansion of industry followed the arrival of the railway in 1852.  The weaving industry has since been replaced by other diversified industries.

This history is reflected in the listed buildings.  The oldest of these, dating from the 17th and 18th centuries, are farmhouses and farm buildings.  In the late 17th and early 18th century, came houses and cottages with stepped windows that were used for domestic weaving.  Later the listed buildings include mills, larger houses built by industrialists, public buildings, churches and chapels, and two war memorials.

Key

Buildings

References

Citations

Sources

Lists of listed buildings in Lancashire
Buildings and structures in the Borough of Rossendale